The River Cities LocoMotives were a professional indoor football team based in Huntington, West Virginia in 2001.  The team competed in the inaugural season of the National Indoor Football League (NIFL).  The "Locos" played their home games at the Big Sandy Superstore Arena. Official team colors were: Crimson, silver, black and gray.

The LocoMotives, coached by Melvin Cunningham, finished the 2001 season with a record of 1–13, and declining fan support caused the team to cease operations after their first season.

Professional indoor football would return to Huntington five years later when the Huntington Heroes began play in 2006.

National Indoor Football League teams
American football teams in West Virginia
Defunct indoor American football teams
Sports in Huntington, West Virginia
American football teams established in 2001
American football teams disestablished in 2001
2001 establishments in West Virginia
2001 disestablishments in West Virginia